Gregg Allen Phillips (born October 13, 1960)
is the former head of the Mississippi Department of Human Services and the author of a tweet, cited by U.S. President Donald Trump, which falsely alleges, without evidence, that between three and five million non-citizens voted in the 2016 elections.

In May 2022, Phillips executive produced and appeared in Dinesh D’Souza's debunked political film 2000 Mules and pushed a false conspiracy theory about election fraud. He also falsely claimed to have 40 years of election integrity and research experience. He was partnering on a project with a Texas-based, partisan-conservative organization named True the Vote which falsely alleges widespread voter fraud in the 2020 election, even though "on the record there has been still no evidence or proof provided that there was any sort of fraud".

Career 
In the 1990s, Phillips campaigned for Republican gubernatorial nominee Kirk Fordice. A year after his election, Governor Fordice in 1993 nominated Phillips to head the Mississippi Department of Human Services. The Mississippi State Senate approved his nomination despite a discrepancy in Phillips' resume uncovered by the Mississippi Joint Committee on Performance Evaluation and Expenditure Review. In 1994, he privatized the collection of child support in two Mississippi counties by signing a contract with a private company based in Virginia. Phillips left the Department of Human Services in 1995, "under fire from the Legislature for his management of the state welfare programs." A week after leaving Department of Human Services, Phillips was hired by Synesis Corporation, a division of Centec Learning, which had an $878,000 contract to lease mobile learning labs to the University of Mississippi at Oxford as part of LEAP, a literacy program that Phillips favored when he headed the Department of Human Services.

Phillips served as Deputy Commissioner for the Texas Health and Human Services Commission from March 2003 to August 2004. With private consultant Chris Britton, Phillips drafted a 2003 bill privatizing the $1 billion human services system in Texas. The Houston Chronicle found that a company started by Phillips and another company of Britton's received a $670,000 state contract from the Texas Workforce Commission in January 2004. Phillips then ran the health care analytics firm AutoGov. Phillips is described as a "vocal conservative who founded a health-care-data company."

Allegations of grift, ethical misconduct, philandering and cronyism
Phillips has faced allegations of ethical misconduct and cronyism, including abusing his previous positions in government in both Mississippi and Texas for personal financial gain. In a follow-up report by the Mississippi Legislature, they concluded that, "Mr. Phillips’s actions create the appearance of impropriety, facilitating an erosion of the public trust… [that] could constitute a violation of state ethics laws."

According to The Guardian, Phillips owes the U.S. government more than $100,000 in unpaid taxes. An investigation by the Associated Press revealed that Phillips was registered to vote in three states. Phillips responded to this investigation by saying, "Doesn't that just demonstrate how broken the system is? That is not fraud — that is a broken system. We need a national ID that travels with people."

According to Kevin Lyons, spokesperson for the Texas Comptroller, Phillips is unable to do business in the state of Texas. "He's one of our revolving door kind of hustlers," said Andrew Wheat, the research director of Texans for Public Justice.

According to the website Intelius, Phillips has been employed by both the Alabama and Mississippi Republican parties. He is listed as a resident of the capital city of Austin, Texas.

An investigation by The Center for Investigative Reporting found that Phillips and the Texas-based nonprofit organization engaged in questionable transactions that involving more than $1 million sent as grift to its founders, and a longtime romantic affair between the founder Catherine Engelbrecht and Phillips.

Phillips was found to "award millions in government contracts" to his own personal businesses or associates involved, and then were "quietly shuttered years later".

Jennifer Wright, chief attorney at Arizona Attorney General Mark Brnovich's election integrity unit, worked for Gregg Phillips at True the Vote before going to work for Brnovich.  Phillips alleged his group investigated the ballot harvesting in San Luis, Arizona, resulting in the arrest of former school board member and former San Luis Mayor Guillermina Fuentes. Records show the investigation was done in August 2020 and the indictment occurred in December 2020. Phillips also claimed that these two indicted suspects pled guilty after having watched the film 2000 Mules. Alma Juarez pled guilty on January 18, 2022 and Guillerma Fuentes pled guilty on April 11, 2022,
whereas the film had a wide release on May 25, and limited screenings May 2 and 4, 2022, making this impossible.

Unsubstantiated and false voter fraud claims 
In 2013, Phillips' firm partnered with the partisan-conservative, Texas-based organization True the Vote to, according to Phillips, update and analyze voter registration data in the U.S. to supposedly identify indicators of each person voting such as: citizenship or non-citizenship, identity, and felony status. He has falsely asserted that his organization has evidence that between three and five million votes were illegal in the 2016 presidential election, and that the 2020 election was rigged to steal the election from Trump, but has not provided any such evidence other than fabricated evidence in the form of Russian maps manipulated to look like American maps tracking non-existing vote mules. Phillips made his voter fraud claims before voter history data was available in most jurisdictions.

2000 Mules (2022) 

In May 2022, Dinesh D'Souza released 2000 Mules, a debunked political film which alleged that Democrat-aligned individuals were paid to illegally collect and deposit ballots into drop boxes in Arizona, Georgia, Michigan, Pennsylvania and Wisconsin during the 2020 presidential election, based on unsubstantiated allegations by True the Vote involving cellphone data.

Philip Bump of The Washington Post wrote about the faulty "reliability of [Phillip's] analysis of data collected from cellphones", saying "there's good reason to think that Phillips's analyses don't include precise measurements of proximity to ballot drop boxes".

According to Houston Public Media and NPR, Phillips made a "false claim" that alleged research helped "solved a murder of a young little girl in Atlanta", with True The Vote acknowledging it had reached out to law enforcement "more than two months later", and had "played no role in those arrests or indictments".

Republican Georgia Secretary of State Brad Raffensperger examined one instance of voter fraud falsely alleged by Phillips, whereby a man delivered multiple ballots to a dropbox. Raffensberger stated that his office found no wrongdoing: "We investigated, and the five ballots that he turned in were all for himself and his family members."

Eight Arizona Republican officials held a meeting with about 200 others to hear a presentation from Phillips weeks after the release of 2000 Mules. Phillips characterized the press as "journalistic terrorists" for demonstrating the film's lack of proof. Asked if he had turned over evidence to law enforcement, Phillips said he had given data to the Arizona attorney general's office and the FBI a year earlier, though the offices said they never received it.

Konnech, Inc. (2022) 
In late 2022, Phillips falsely alleged in a social media and podcast campaign that his associates had discovered evidence that Konnech, a poll worker management software company, had stored data on a Chinese computer server and allowed the Chinese government to access it. Phillips said the discovery had been made by two associates who hacked Konnech's servers. Konnech filed a federal defamation suit against True the Vote in September, also alleging True the Vote acquired information on millions of poll workers from the alleged hack. During an October court hearing, the involvement of a third Phillips associate was disclosed, but Catherine Engelbrecht and Phillips declined federal judge Kenneth Hoyt's demand to identify the man, asserting he was an FBI informant and in danger from drug cartels. Hoyt told them if they didn't identify the man within two days, and present the poll worker data they allegedly obtained, they would be held in contempt of court and jailed; they were jailed for contempt on October 31, 2022. Engelbrecht and Phillips appealed their incarceration to the Fifth Circuit Court of Appeals, a three-judge panel of which ordered them released on November 8.

References

External links

1960 births
People from Montgomery, Alabama
Alabama Republicans
Businesspeople from Mississippi
Mississippi Republicans
People from Jackson, Mississippi
Businesspeople from Texas
People from Austin, Texas
Texas Republicans
Businesspeople from Florida
Florida Republicans
People from Bradenton, Florida
Living people